The 1918 Exeter by-election was held on 7 May 1918.  The by-election was held due to the appointment of the incumbent Conservative MP, Henry Duke, as Lord Justice of Appeal.  It was won by the Conservative candidate Sir Robert Newman, who was unopposed due to a War-time electoral pact.

References

1918 elections in the United Kingdom
1918 in England
Elections in Exeter
By-elections to the Parliament of the United Kingdom in Devon constituencies
Unopposed by-elections to the Parliament of the United Kingdom (need citation)
20th century in Exeter
1910s in Devon